Francis Barlow may refer to:

Francis Barlow (artist) ( 1626–1704), British painter, etcher, and illustrator
Francis C. Barlow (1834–1896), US lawyer, politician, and general

See also
Frank Barlow (disambiguation)